Kia Rud (also Romanized as Kīā Rūd) is a village in Tutaki Rural District, in the Central District of Siahkal County, Gilan Province, Iran. At the 2006 census, its population was 139, in 39 families.

References 

Populated places in Siahkal County